Harry Meyen (born Harald Haubenstock; 31 August 1924 – 15 April 1979) was a German film actor. He appeared in more than 40 films and television productions between 1948 and 1975. In the 1960s he also worked as a theatre director in West Germany.

Personal life
Meyen was born in Hamburg, the son of a Jewish merchant who was deported to a concentration camp during the Nazi regime. The 18-year-old Meyen himself was incarcerated as a Mischling and survived the Neuengamme concentration camp.

After the war, he began his career with Willy Maertens at the Hamburg Thalia Theater. From 1952 he performed at the Theater Aachen and from 1955 moved to Berlin. Also starring in films directed by Helmut Käutner, Falk Harnack and Wolfgang Staudte, he played the role of a young Luftwaffe officer in the 1955 movie Des Teufels General side by side with Curd Jürgens. He also worked as a dubbing actor giving his voice to Dirk Bogarde, Robert Mitchum, Michel Piccoli, Peter Sellers, and Jean-Louis Trintignant.

From 1953 to 1966 he was married to actress Anneliese Römer. In July 1966 he married Romy Schneider in Saint-Jean-Cap-Ferrat. Their son David Christopher was born 3 December 1966; the family lived in Berlin and later in Hamburg. Meyen dealt with the production of theatre plays and operas, however with moderate success. The couple finally divorced in 1975, and Schneider took their son with her to France.

Meyen was a depressive, his condition caused by the torture he had received from the Nazis for being half-Jewish. In 1979, Meyen hanged himself at home in Hamburg. He is buried in the Ohlsdorf Cemetery. His son David Meyen died in an accident two years later.

Selected filmography

 Nora's Ark (1948) – Peter Stoll
  (1951) – Roger
 The Sergeant's Daughter (1952) – Leutnant Robert Kroldt
 Alraune (1952) – Count Geroldingen
 We're Dancing on the Rainbow (1952) – Grigory
 Beloved Life (1953) – Jürgen von Bolin
 Regina Amstetten (1954) – Jürgen von Bredow
 The Faithful Hussar (1954) – Fred Wacker
 The Telephone Operator (1954) – Curt Cramer
 Des Teufels General (1955) – Leutnant Hartmann
 Miracle Mile (1956) – Philip Ardent
 My Sixteen Sons (1956)
 Night of Decision (1956)
  (1957) – Hubert Rombach, Kunsthändler
 Scandal in Bad Ischl (1957) – Dr. Balsam, Assistenzarzt
 Escape from Sahara (1958) – Jean de Maire
  (1958)
 Iron Gustav (1958) – Assessor
 Freddy, the Guitar and the Sea (1959) – Lothar Brückner
 Old Heidelberg (1959) – Graf Detlev v. Asterberg
 The High Life (1960) – Heinrich
 Sweetheart of the Gods (1960) – Volker Hellberg
 Storm in a Water Glass (1960) – George
 A Woman for Life (1960) – Leutnant Karl Degenhardt
 Lebensborn (1961) – Hauptsturmführer Dr. Hagen
 Mörderspiel (1961) – Klaus Troger
 Doctor Sibelius (1962) – Dr. Möllendorf
 Redhead (1962) – Herbert Lucas
 Enough Rope (1963) – Tony
 The Curse of the Hidden Vault (1964) – Inspector Angel
 Is Paris Burning? (1966) – Lieutenant von Arnim
 Triple Cross (1966) – Lieutenant Keller
  (directed by Harry Meyen, 1970, TV film) – Sam Kinsale
 Derrick: "Kamillas junger Freund" (1975, TV) – Dr. Hauffe
 Derrick: "Mord im TEE 91" (1977, TV) – Harris

References

External links

 
 

1924 births
1979 suicides
German male film actors
German people of Jewish descent
Suicides by hanging in Germany
Male actors from Hamburg
20th-century German male actors
Neuengamme concentration camp survivors
Burials at the Ohlsdorf Cemetery
German torture victims